Thrity Umrigar is an Indian-American journalist, critic, and novelist.

Early life
Umrigar was born in Mumbai, India to a Parsi family, and relocated to the United States at the age of 21.

Career 
Umrigar received a Bachelor of Science from Bombay University, an M.A. From Ohio State University, and a Ph.D. in English from Kent State University.

She has written for The Washington Post and the Cleveland Plain Dealer and The Huffington Post and regularly writes for The Boston Globes book pages. She is the Armitage Professor of English at Case Western Reserve University in Cleveland. She is active on the national lecture circuit.

Works 
 Bombay Time (2001) 
 First Darling of the Morning: Selected Memories of an Indian Childhood (2004) 
 The Space Between Us (2006) 
 If Today Be Sweet (2007) 
 The Weight of Heaven (2009) 
 The World We Found (2012) 
 The Story Hour (2014) 
 Everybody's Son (2017) 
 When I Carried You In My Belly (2017) 
 The Secrets Between Us (2018)
 Honor (2022)

Recognition 
 2000 - Nieman Fellowship for Journalism at Harvard University
 2006 - Finalist for the PEN/Open Book award
 2009 - Cleveland Arts Prize in Literature
 2013 - Lambda Literary Award in the Lesbian General Fiction category for her novel, The World We Found

See also
 List of Indian writers

References

External links

 Personal website

American women writers of Indian descent
Living people
Indian emigrants to the United States
Nieman Fellows
Ohio State University alumni
Kent State University alumni
Writers from Mumbai
American people of Parsi descent
University of Mumbai alumni
Case Western Reserve University faculty
Year of birth missing (living people)
Writers from Cleveland
Lambda Literary Award for Lesbian Fiction winners
Parsi people
21st-century American novelists
21st-century American women writers
American women academics